"Edge of the Universe" is a rock song by the Bee Gees, written by Barry and Robin Gibb from the album Main Course released in 1975, and also released as a B-side of "Nights on Broadway".

Recording
In 1975, the Bee Gees moved their operations to Miami Beach, Florida at the suggestion of Eric Clapton following his comeback album 461 Ocean Boulevard the year before. The group recorded an album with famed R&B producer Arif Mardin called Mr. Natural in 1974 with little commercial success. The album did, however, turn the Gibbs towards a new sound compared to the kind of music the brothers were producing in the early-1970s. This new flavored sound carried over on to their next album, 1975's Main Course, also produced by Arif Mardin.

The Bee Gees had formed the nucleus of their band in early 1975 with Blue Weaver on keyboards, Alan Kendall on lead guitar and Dennis Bryon on drums. Also part of the Bee Gees to mid to late-1970s sound was The Boneroo Horns brought to Miami in 1973 by Dr. John. Recording for "Edge of the Universe" took place on a 30 January, the same day as "Jive Talkin'", "Songbird", "Fanny (Be Tender with My Love)" and "All This Making Love".

Personnel
Barry Gibb — lead vocals, rhythm guitar
Robin Gibb — lead vocals
Maurice Gibb — bass, harmony vocals
Alan Kendall — lead guitar
Dennis Bryon — drums
Blue Weaver — synthesizer, keyboard

Edge of the Universe (Live)

As part of their 1976 Children of the World tour, The Bee Gees recorded their 20 December concert at The Forum in Los Angeles, which contained a brisk performance of "Edge of the Universe", which was eventually released as a single in the summer of 1977 and became a Top 40 hit in the U.S.

The biggest differences between the studio and live versions are a slower tempo on the original and the use of synthesizer (replacing the original guitar riff on the original) on the live version.

Cash Box said that "the tune combines the sounds that made the Bee Gees popular in the '60s as well as the '70s, featuring an impeccably harmonized chorus and a tricky rock and roll bridge that keeps listeners begging for more." Record World said that "the melody is its most attractive feature, and the performance, of course, shines."

Chart performance

References

1975 songs
1977 singles
Bee Gees songs
Songs written by Barry Gibb
Songs written by Maurice Gibb
Songs written by Robin Gibb
Song recordings produced by Arif Mardin
RSO Records singles